Obediah Farrar House is a historic home located near Haywood, Lee County, North Carolina. It was built in the 1850s, and is a two-story, three bay, mortise-and-tenon frame I-house with Greek Revival style design elements.  Also on the property is the contributing road segment and landscape.

It was listed on the National Register of Historic Places in 1993.

References

Houses on the National Register of Historic Places in North Carolina
Greek Revival houses in North Carolina
Houses completed in 1855
Houses in Lee County, North Carolina
National Register of Historic Places in Lee County, North Carolina